The Colettine Poor Clares are a reform branch of the Order of St. Clare, founded by Clare of Assisi in Italy in 1211. They follow the interpretation of the Rule of St. Clare established by Saint Colette in 1410, originally a French hermit and member of the Third Order of St. Francis.

History

Colette was born in Corbie, a town in the Picardy region of France in January 1381 to an elderly couple. She lost her parents in 1399 and, after a brief stint in a beguinage, in 1402 she received the religious habit of the Third Order of St. Francis and became a hermit, living in a hut near the parish church, under the spiritual direction of the abbot of the local Benedictine abbey.

After four years of following this ascetic way of life, in 1406, Colette came to believe that she was being called to reform the Poor Clares, the Second Order of the Franciscan movement, and return that Order to its original Franciscan ideals of absolute poverty and austerity.

Foundation
In October of that year, she traveled to Nice to seek the blessing of the Antipope Benedict XIII, who was recognized in France at that time as the rightful pope. Benedict received her and allowed her to take vows as a Poor Clare nun, giving her mission his blessing through several papal bulls, which authorized her both to reform existing monasteries and to found new ones according to her reform.

After spending several years in Beaune in the Duchy of Burgundy, under the guidance of the Blessed Henry of Beaume, O.F.M., (ca. 1367-1439) in 1410 they transferred to the County of Burgundy in 1408, where she established the first successful community of Poor Clare nuns under her inspired way of life in a semi-derelict monastery of the Order in Besançon.

Expansion
From Besançon her reform spread to Auxonne (1412), to Amiens. It began to spread outside France with foundations in Heidelberg, Germany (1444), and from there to other communities of Poor Clares around Europe. In total, 18 monasteries were founded before her death in March 1447.

Colette established a reform community in Poligny in 1415, and from there another in Ghent in 1442. From Ghent, a Colettine community was established in Bruges in 1457. In 1857 Poor Clares from Bruges established a monastery at Notting Hill, London. In 1928, Bishop Francis Vaughan asked his cousin, Mother Felix Clare Vaughan, abbess of Notting Hill, to send sisters to his Welsh diocese, and the community of Ty Mam Duw was founded.

For the monasteries which followed her reform, Colette prescribed extreme poverty, going barefoot, and the observance of perpetual fasting and abstinence. The Colettines follow their own Constitutions sanctioned in 1434 by the then-Minister General of the friars, William of Casale, and approved in 1448 by Pope Nicholas V, in 1458 by Pope Pius II, and in 1482 by Pope Sixtus IV.

The community includes both cloistered nuns and extern sisters.

Colettines in the United States
In Germany, the late 19th-century saw a major wave of suppressions of monastic institutions under the government policy of Kulturkampf. Among them was the Colettine monastery in Düsseldorf, whose members had been expelled from their home. They sought a place of refuge in the United States and sent requests to various dioceses around the country. The Bishop of Cleveland agreed to receive them into his diocese, and five nuns of the German community travelled there in 1877, establishing a small monastery in the city on Perry Street. They were the first monastery of the Order of St. Clare in North America.

In 1916 Bishop Peter James Muldoon, of Rockford, Illinois invited the sisters in Cleveland to establish a presence in his diocese.

The Poor Clare Monastery of Our Lady of Mercy, in Belleville, Illinois, under the patronage of Our Lady of Guadalupe, was founded in June 1986 from the Poor Clare Monastery of Our Lady of Guadalupe in Roswell, New Mexico.

Seven founding sisters arrived in Kokomo, Indiana in 1959, at the invitation of Most Rev. John J. Carberry, the bishop of the Diocese of Lafayette-in-Indiana. 

Today there are also monasteries in California, Illinois and South Carolina. Foundations from the American monasteries have been established in Brazil (1950) and the Netherlands (1990).

Friars
A branch of Franciscan friars following the spirit of Colette's reform was established and approved, under the leadership of Henry de Beaume. They were known as Coletans, and were connected to the monasteries of the Colettine nuns. By 1448, there were thirteen friaries of this branch. Along with other smaller reforms, they were merged by the Holy See into the Observant branch of the friars in 1517.

See also
Saint Colette
Mary Magdalen Bentivoglio
Poor Clares

References

External sources
 Immaculate Heart Monastery, Los Altos Hills, California
 Monastery of Poor Clares, Santa Barbara, California